Samuel Ranby (29 October 1897 – 20 January 1958) was an English footballer.

Ranby played for Gilberdyke, Hull City, Reckitt's, Selby Town and York City.

References

1897 births
Footballers from Kingston upon Hull
1958 deaths
English footballers
Association football forwards
Hull City A.F.C. players
Selby Town F.C. players
York City F.C. players
English Football League players
Midland Football League players